Chicken Police: Paint It RED! is a point-and-click adventure game developed by The Wild Gentlemen.  HandyGames released it in 2020 for multiple platforms.  Players control a burnt-out cop who is investigating a crime in a city of anthropomorphic animals.

Gameplay 
Chicken Police is set in an alternate world populated by anthropomorphic animals that are generally depicted as humans with animal heads.  Players control Sonny Featherland, a burnt-out cop with the head of a rooster.  Sonny was formerly a celebrated hero but has become an alcoholic and is estranged from his former partner, Marty MacChicken.  After being approached by a distraught woman, Sonny reunites with Marty to solve one last case before his retirement.  The game is a point-and-click adventure game styled after 1940s film noir.  Most of the game is in a stylistic monochrome, but colors are used sparingly for emphasis.  Players look for clues, interview suspects, and eventually perform interrogations.  When interrogating a suspect, a minigame determines their success.  After being informed of personality quirks, players attempt to find a line of questioning that will exploit that suspect's personality.  Poorly-chosen lines of interrogation can close off dialogue options and reduce how much of the story's background players learn, but this does not put the game in an unwinnable state.

Development 
The premise was inspired by a YouTube video in which two chickens appear to break up a fight between rabbits.  To create the characters, The Wild Gentlemen started with human models in a studio and used Adobe Photoshop to change the heads to animals.  Initially, the animal heads came from stock photography, but the developers found the images could be made more realistic-looking by taking their own photographs at wildlife parks and zoos.  Some details were hand-drawn, and they made accessories, such as Bubo the owl's glasses, from scratch.  The resulting images were then broken into textures and animated in Unity.  Both classic adventure games and films noir were influences on the game.  The relationship between the two cops is influenced by buddy cop films.  The team often worked remotely and were spread across multiple countries.

Chicken Police was released on Microsoft Windows, PlayStation 4, Nintendo Switch, and Xbox One in November 2020 and Google Stadia in December 2021.  It was ported to iOS and Android in June 2021.

Reception 

Laura Cress of Adventure Gamers praised the game's voice acting, graphics, and story, though she said it has "too many unnecessary mini-games".  Hardcore Gamers reviewer, Chris Shive, similarly criticized the minigames while praising the noir atmosphere.  Writing for Nintendo Life, Stuart Gipp called it "a polished, captivating experience" and said it was one of the best adventure games on the Switch.  Luke Kemp of PC Gamer called it "one of the most surreal experiences of my life" and praised the writing and acting.  Caitlin Argyros wrote in her review for RPGfan that the mystery has an "abrupt and not quite satisfying" conclusion, but she enjoyed the writing nonetheless.  Christopher Byrd wrote in The Washington Post, "In my tiny pantheon of visual novel/adventure games, Chicken Police - Paint it Red has a spot."

References

External links 
 

2020 video games
Adventure games
Detective video games
Neo-noir video games
Video games about birds
Video games about police officers
Windows games
PlayStation 4 games
Xbox One games
Nintendo Switch games
IOS games
Android (operating system) games
Single-player video games
Indie video games
HandyGames games